Waterfront is a 1928 silent film released with sound effects and music, produced and released by First National Pictures. The film was directed by William A. Seiter and starred Dorothy Mackaill and Jack Mulhall, then a popular duo under the First National banner.

Cast
Dorothy Mackaill as Peggy Ann Andrews
Jack Mulhall as Jack Dowling
James Bradbury Sr. as Peter Seastrom
Knute Erickson as Captain John Andrews
Ben Hendricks Jr. as Oilcan Olson
William Bailey as Brute Mullin
Pat Harmon as Oiler

Preservation status
The new Library of Congress database shows a print surviving complete at Cineteca Italiana in Milan.

References

External links
 
 

1928 films
American silent feature films
Films directed by William A. Seiter
First National Pictures films
1928 comedy-drama films
1920s English-language films
American black-and-white films
1920s American films
Silent American comedy-drama films